The Dartmouth Big Green men's soccer program represents the Dartmouth College in all NCAA Division I men's college soccer competitions. Founded in 1915, the Big Green compete in the Ivy League. The Big Green are coached by Bo Oshoniyi, who has coached the program since 2018. The Big Green plays their home matches at Burnham Field, on the Dartmouth campus.

Roster

Individuals honors

All-Americans

Ivy League honors 
The following Dartmouth men's soccer players and coaches have earned Ivy League individual honors.

Players of the Year

Rookies of the Year

Coaches of the Year

Coaching records 
There have been 11 coaches in Dartmouth Soccer's history.

Honors 
 Ivy League (12): 1964, 1988, 1992, 2002, 2004, 2005, 2008, 2011, 2014, 2015, 2016, 2017

References

External links 
 

 
1915 establishments in New Hampshire
Association football clubs established in 1915